Mumtaz Begum (born 7 April 1923) is an Indian retired actress who appeared in Bollywood films.

Life and career 
Begum was born on 7 April 1923. She acted as a character actor playing the roles of mothers and grandmothers in movies like the Madhubala-starrer Barsaat Ki Raat (1960), Chaudhvin Ka Chand (1960) and Mere Mehboob (1963). Mumtaz is the aunt of Bollywood actress Nazneen.

Filmography

 Dahej (1950)
 Deewana (1952)
 Jagriti (1954)
Yasmin (1955)
 Jhanak Jhanak Payal Baaje (1955)
 New Delhi (1956)
 Lajwanti (1958)
 Chirag Kahan Roshni Kahan (1959)
  CHAMBE DI KALI (1960) punjabi movie 
 Kala Bazar (1960)
 Ek Phool Char Kaante (1960)
 Barsaat Ki Raat (1960)
 Parakh (1960)
 Chaudhvin Ka Chand (1960)
 Opera House (1961)
 Aas Ka Panchhi (1961)
 Dr. Vidya (1962)
 Dil Tera Diwana (1962)
 Anpadh (1962)
 Mere Mehboob (1963)
 Ayee Milan Ki Bela (1964)
 Aap Ki Parchhaiyan (1964)
 Sunghursh (1968)
 Neel Kamal (1968)
     Yamla Jatt (1976) Punjabi movie 
 Nanak Dukhiya Sub Sansar (1970) punjabi movie 
 Mehboob Ki Mehndi (1971)
 Gambler (1971)
 Aap Aye Bahaar Ayee (1971)
 Apna Desh (1972)
 Dil Diwana (1974)
 Apradhi (1974)
 Rafoo Chakkar (1975)
     Takkra (1976) punjabi movie
 Aadmi Sadak Ka (1977)
 Bhola Bhala (1978)
 Aakhri Kasam (1979)
 Aatish (1979)
 Jwalamukhi (1980 film)Amrit'' (1986)

References

External links
 
 Mumtaz Begum Profile at Upperstall.com

1923 births
Possibly living people
20th-century Indian actresses
Actresses in Hindi cinema
Indian film actresses